Bo Grumpus is American psychedelic rock band that originated in Boston, Massachusetts in 1967.  They are best known for their debut album in 1968, Before the War, which was produced by Felix Pappalardi.

References

Psychedelic rock music groups from Massachusetts